Barbara Cupisti is an Italian award-winning documentary director with a long career as film actress.

As an actress, she is well known outside of her native country by horror fans, who will most likely recognize her from her films with director Michele Soavi and Dario Argento.

As a director, she is considered one of the most talented female directors of documentaries in the world. Mostly focused on human rights, she said that "her goal is to "give voice "to the people who don't have the opportunity to speak".

Career as actress

Cupisti started her career as a dancer with the Luis Falco company. She specialized in action movies and became famous in France for her role in the very popular TV "feuilleton" Chateauvallon.

She speaks Italian, English, French, Spanish and Esperanto.

Career as director

Since 2002 she started to direct for Rai Cinema. Her first documentary movie Mothers (90 min), produced by the Italian RaiCinema and shown in Venice Film Festival 2007, won the David di Donatello 2008 for Best Documentary of the year. It was considered a masterpiece by both the national and international press.

Her second documentary, Forbidden Childhood, was screened in the festival circuit and has received the Audience Award for the Best Documentary Film at the Bahrein International Human Rights Film Festival (May 2009) and the Amnesty International Cinema and Human Rights Award at the Pesaro International Film Festival for the New Cinema (June 2009), and at the Bobbio Film Festival of Marco Bellocchio. Unicef Italia gave to this movie the High Patronage.

 (I am - Stories of slavery), her third film, is about human trafficking in Italy. It was presented at the Venice Film Festival 2011 with the patronage of Amnesty International Italy and was a finalist at the Monte-Carlo Television Festival.

Fratelli e Sorelle-storie di carcere is a two-episode documentary about the dramatic situation in Italian prisons. The film has been awarded with Premio Ilaria Alpi 2012, the most important journalist award in Italy, for the best documentary of the year and got the nomination for David di Donatello 2013.

Interferenze Rom 2013 was shot in the Republic of Macedonia, Italy, and France and talks about the Gipsy community in Europe.

Cupisti made a series of three documentaries about refugees from all over the word and the reasons for their exile, titled Exiles: The wars, Exiles: Tibet, and Exiles: The Environment.

In 2016 Exiles: The wars wins the Special Nastro d'argento of the National Syndicate of Italian Film Journalists.

In 2018, Womanity is released. The film tells the story of thirty-six hours of four women in India, Egypt and the United States. It attended the Rome Film Festival and won at the Italian Film Festival in Madrid.

She is currently working on the post production of the documentary My America.

Filmography

Actress

Director

External links

Secret Garden Productions

References

Italian film actresses
Italian television actresses
Living people
Accademia Nazionale di Arte Drammatica Silvio D'Amico alumni
1962 births
Italian women film directors